Small Miracles is the eleventh studio album released by Canadian country rock band Blue Rodeo, released on September 25, 2007.

Track listing
All Songs by Jim Cuddy and Greg Keelor unless noted.
"So Far Away" – 3:48
"This Town" – 3:47
"Blue House" (Cuddy, Keelor, Damian Rogers) – 3:25
"3 Hours Away" – 3:38
"It Makes Me Wonder" – 5:43
"Summer Girls" – 4:10
"Together" – 4:59
"Mystic River" – 4:11
"Black Ribbon" – 6:45
"C'mon" – 3:16
"Small Miracles" – 3:27
"Beautiful" – 6:15
"Where I Was Before" – 3:45

Reception

Although Small Miracles did not produce any high charting singles, such as 1990's "Til I Am Myself Again" which reached number 19 on the Billboard Modern Rock Tracks chart, critical reception was generally positive. Allmusic marveled that the album "sounds this consistently fresh and inspired coming 20 years after Blue Rodeo's debut.". The first single, C'mon, peaked at number 68 on the Canadian Hot 100. Although the second single, 3 Hours Away, did not chart, the following single, This Town, did.

Chart performance

Certifications

References

Blue Rodeo albums
2007 albums
Juno Award for Adult Alternative Album of the Year albums